Louise Claire Upston  (née McGill, born 14 March 1971) is a New Zealand politician of the National Party. In the Fifth National Government, led by Prime Minister Bill English, she was the Minister of Corrections.

Early life
Louise McGill was born in North Shore and grew up in East Coast Bays. Her parents are Ian and the late Norma McGill. The youngest of four children, she has two sisters and one brother. She attended Rangitoto College, from which she graduated in 1988, and where she was friends with Amy Adams. Since before the age of ten, she had wanted to become a member of parliament.

McGill dropped out of law school and instead founded a management consultancy firm, McGill Manning when she was 19. Her clients included Air New Zealand, Russell McVeagh, and Datacom Group. She then studied at the Waikato Management School and graduated with a Master of Business Administration.

McGill married Craig Upston, and they have three children. The Upston family lives in Karapiro.

Member of Parliament

Fifth National Government, 2008–2017
Upston was elected to Parliament at the 2008 general election for the  electorate, where she unseated Mark Burton, a Labour cabinet minister who had represented the area for 15 years. She received attention in the media for comments made in her maiden statement to the House of Representatives, such as her slogan approach to crime: "The police are good. The criminals are bad. It's that simple."

This made Taupō one of the safest seats in the country.

Upston was appointed to Junior Whip for the National Government after the 2011 election. Following the February 2013 reshuffle by John Key, Upston was elected Chief Whip and joined by Tim Macindoe and Jami-Lee Ross who served as Junior and Third Whip in Parliament.

In October 2014, she became the Minister of Land Information and the Minister for Women.

After Bill English succeeded John Key as Prime Minister in December 2016, Upston served as the Minister of Corrections. That same month, she was succeeded as Minister of Women by Paula Bennett.

Sixth Labour Government, 2017–present
During the 2017 general election, Upston retained Taupō by a margin 14,335 votes.

During the 2020 general election, Upston retained Taupo by a margin of 5,119 votes.

On 19 January 2023, Upston became the National Party's family violence protection spokesperson during a reshuffle of Party leader Christopher Luxon's shadow cabinet. She retained her social development & employment, and child poverty reduction portfolios as well as her sixth place ranking in Luxon's shadow cabinet.

Political and social views
Upston is conservative on conscience issues

Alcohol age limit
In 2012, Louise Upston voted to raise the purchase age of alcohol to 20.

Same-sex marriage
She voted against the Marriage (Definition of Marriage) Amendment Bill in 2013.

Feminism
In November 2014, Upston stated she is not a feminist when she sang praises of beauty pageants. In April 2015, Upston refused to comment on women's rights in the work place after it was revealed John Key was forced to apologise to a Parnell cafe worker for repeatedly pulling her hair. Green Party co-leader Metiria Turei accused Upston of abdicating her responsibilities as Minister for Women.

Conversion therapy
In line with the rest of the National party, Upston voted against the first reading of the Conversion Practices Prohibition Legislation Act 2022. The party allowed MPs to vote freely on subsequent readings; Upston was one of only seven MPs to vote against it at its second reading, but she voted in favour of it at its third and final reading.

References

External links
Louise Upston MP official site

1971 births
Living people
People educated at Rangitoto College
University of Waikato alumni
New Zealand National Party MPs
New Zealand MPs for North Island electorates
Members of the New Zealand House of Representatives
21st-century New Zealand politicians
Candidates in the 2017 New Zealand general election
21st-century New Zealand women politicians